The 2020 Malaysia Super League, known as the CIMB Bank Liga Super Malaysia 2020 for sponsorship reasons, was the 17th season of the Malaysia Super League, the top-tier professional football league in Malaysia.

Johor Darul Ta'zim were the defending champions, having won their sixth title the previous season.

The first transfer window was from 16 January to 15 March 2020.

On 13 March 2020, it was announced that the league would be suspended indefinitely, due to the ongoing COVID-19 pandemic. On 1 May, it was announced that the league would resume in September dependent on the situation at the time. Due to time constraints, the home-and-away format has been scrapped. Teams played each other only once, meaning that the champion of the Super League was decided after eleven rounds of matches.

Teams

Changes from last season
Kuala Lumpur and PKNP are relegated to the Malaysia Premier League after finishing bottom and second-bottom respectively in last season's Malaysia Super League.

Sabah and PDRM are promoted after securing their place as champions and 3rd-placed finishers in last season's Malaysia Premier League (runners-up Johor Darul Ta'zim II is ineligible for the Super League due to being the reserve team to Johor Darul Ta'zim).

As PKNS has changed their status as the reserve team to Selangor, they are therefore replaced by the 5th-placed finishers of last season's Malaysia Premier League UiTM (4th-placed finishers Terengganu II is ineligible for the Super League due to being the reserve team to Terengganu FC).

Team changes
Promoted from the 2019 Malaysia Premier League

 Sabah
 PDRM
 UiTM

Relegated to the 2020 Malaysia Premier League

 PKNS
 PKNP
 Kuala Lumpur

Clubs locations

Personnel, kit and sponsoring

Foreign players
Southeast Asia (SEA) players are required to have acquired at least 30 international caps for their senior national team with no period restriction on when they are earned while those who has less than 30 international caps will be subjected to MFL approval.

Note: Flags indicate national team as defined under FIFA eligibility rules. Players may hold more than one FIFA and non-FIFA nationality.

 Players name in bold indicates the player is registered during the mid-season transfer window.
 Foreign players who left their clubs or were de-registered from playing squad due to medical issues or other matters.

Naturalisation players

Notes:
  Carrying Malaysian heritage.
  Participated in the Malaysia national team squad.

League table

Result table

Positions by round
The table lists the positions of teams after each week of matches.In order to preserve chronological evolvements, any postponed matches are not included to the round at which they were originally scheduled, but added to the full round they were played immediately afterwards.

Season statistics

Scoring
First goal of the season: 44 minutes and 51 seconds 
 Maurício for Johor Darul Ta'zim against Kedah  (28 February 2020)
 Fastest goal in a match: 1 minute and 47 seconds
 Dominique Da Sylva for Terengganu against Kedah (7 March 2020)
 Goal scored at the latest point in a match: 94 minutes and 25 seconds
 Kogileswaran Raj for Petaling Jaya City against Pahang (6 March 2020)
 First hat-trick of the season: 80 minutes and 52 seconds
 Dominique Da Sylva for Terengganu against Kedah (7 March 2020)
 Fastest hat-trick of the season: 80 minutes and 52 seconds
 Dominique Da Sylva for Terengganu against Kedah (7 March 2020)
 Most goals scored by one player in a match: 4 goals
  Dominique Da Sylva for Terengganu against Kedah (7 March 2020)
 Widest winning margin: 7 goals
 Johor Darul Ta'zim 7–0 Perak (4 September 2020)
 Most goals in a match: 7 goals
 Kedah 3–4 Terengganu (7 March 2020)
 Johor Darul Ta'zim 7–0 Perak (4 September 2020)
 Most goals in one half: 4 goals
 Kedah vs Terengganu (7 March 2020) 2–1 at half time, 3–4 final
 Terengganu vs Selangor  (11 March 2020) 1–1 at half time, 3–3 final
 Most goals in one half by a single team: 3 goals
 Kedah vs Terengganu (7 March 2020) 2–1 at half time, 3–4 final

Top goalscorers

Top assists

Hat-tricks 

 

Note
4 Player scored 4 goals

Clean sheets

Discipline

Player
 Most yellow cards: 3
  Shakir Hamzah (Kedah)
  Arif Anwar (UiTM)
 Most red cards: 1
  Azalinullah Alias (Terengganu)

Club
 Most yellow cards: 11
 Perak
 Most red cards: 1
 Terengganu

See also
 2020 Malaysia Premier League
 2020 Malaysia FA Cup
 2020 Malaysia Cup

Notes

References

External links
 Football Association of Malaysia website
 Malaysian Football League website 

Malaysia Super League
Malaysia Super League seasons
1
Malaysia Super League, 2020
Malaysian Super League, 2020